Tingena amiculata is a species of moth in the family Oecophoridae. It is endemic to New Zealand and has been observed in the Nelson, Tasman and Canterbury regions. This species has been collected amongst Hebe species and shrubland at altitudes of up to 4500 ft. It is similar in appearance to its near relatives Tingena basella and Tingena laudata.

Taxonomy
This species was first described by Alfred Philpott in 1926 using specimens collected by Philpott at the Cobb Valley and the Mount Arthur tableland in December and named it Borkhausenia amiculata. George Hudson discussed this species under the name B. amiculata in his 1928 publication The butterflies and moths of New Zealand. In 1988 J. S. Dugdale placed this species within the genus Tingena. The male holotype, collected at the Mount Arthur tableland, is held in the New Zealand Arthropod Collection.

Description 
Philpott described this species as follows:

This species is very similar in appearance to its near relative T. basella but differs as the apex of the forewing of T. amiculata is more pointed. It might also be confused with the species T. laudata however the latter species is smaller with longer ciliations on its antennae and has differences in markings and colour.

Distribution 

This species is endemic to New Zealand. It has been collected in its type location Mount Arthur tableland, Cobb Valley and Arthur's Pass.

Habitat and hosts
This species has been collected amongst Hebe species and shrubland at altitudes of up to 4500 ft.

References

Oecophoridae
Moths of New Zealand
Moths described in 1926
Endemic fauna of New Zealand
Taxa named by Alfred Philpott
Endemic moths of New Zealand